Sante Pacini (1735 – ) was an Italian painter and engraver active mostly in Tuscany in an early Neoclassic style.

Life and work 
Sante was born in Florence, and was a pupil of Ignazio Hugford.

He was the son of Michele Pacini, an engraver working for Anton Domenico Gabbiani. Sante made engravings for Cento Pensieri Diversi by Gabbiani.

References

1735 births
1790 deaths
Artists from Florence
18th-century Italian painters
Italian male painters
Italian neoclassical painters
18th-century Italian male artists